Xinhua Township is a township of Ningnan County in southern Sichuan province, China, located more than  southwest of the county seat as the crow flies. , it has six villages under its administration.

References 

Township-level divisions of Sichuan